Mahmoud Khosravivafa or Mahmoud Khosravi-Vafa, is an Iranian conservative politician, who is the President of National Olympic Committee of the Islamic Republic of Iran since 2022. He was a Tehran councillor member from 2003 to 2007. He was also the President of Iran's National Paralympic Committee of the Islamic Republic of Iran from 2001 to 2022, and the President of Sports Federation for the Disabled, in two period of times from 1981 to 1985, and from 1990 to 2017.

He was appointed by Mohammad Aliabadi as one of his deputies in the Physical Education Organization, and unsuccessfully ran for president of National Olympic Committee of the Islamic Republic of Iran in 2014.

References

 Councillor profile

1953 births
Living people
Tehran Councillors 2003–2007
Popular Front of Islamic Revolution Forces politicians
Alliance of Builders of Islamic Iran politicians
Iranian sports executives and administrators